Fruit Belt is a term in the United States for an area where the microclimate provides good conditions for fruit growing.

Fruit Belts are prominent around the North American Great Lakes region, notably West Michigan (Fruit Ridge) and western Northern Lower Michigan in tandem, and the southern shore of Lake Erie. The conditions that produce a micro-climate favorable to fruit cultivation are the same that produce lake-effect snow; therefore, Fruit Belts and snowbelts are often concurrent. The map at right shows Great Lakes snowbelts which cover a somewhat larger area than the fruit belt. Notably, there are no fruit belts in Michigan's Upper Peninsula. A Fruit Belt also exists in Central Washington State. Berries are grown on the West Coast.

See also
 American Viticultural Area
 List of belt regions of the United States

Notes

Further reading

Agricultural production in the United States
Great Lakes region (U.S.)
Agriculture in Michigan
Agriculture in Ohio
Agriculture in New York (state)
Agriculture in Washington (state)
Agriculture in Pennsylvania
Regions of Michigan
Regions of New York (state)
Eastern Washington
Belt
Belt regions of the United States
Agricultural belts